Acrantophis is a genus of terrestrial boid snakes endemic to the island of Madagascar.

Species
Two species are currently recognized.
 Acrantophis madagascariensis - (Duméril & Bibron, 1844)- Madagascar ground boa 
 Acrantophis dumerili - Jan, 1860- Duméril's  boa

References

Further reading

External links
 

Boidae
Biota of Madagascar
Reptiles of Madagascar
Taxa named by Giorgio Jan
Snake genera